Franz Heinzl (13 April 1892 – 16 May 1922) was an Austrian footballer. He played in seven matches for the Austria national football team from 1914 to 1917.

References

External links
 

1892 births
1922 deaths
Austrian footballers
Austria international footballers
Place of birth missing
Association footballers not categorized by position